Tleil   (also Tlayleh, Tlaile, Tuleil, Tlayl, Al-Talil, Altalil) is a  town in Akkar Governorate, Lebanon, close to the border with Syria.

The population in Tleil belongs to various Christian denominations.

History
In 1838, Eli Smith noted  the village as Tuleil,  whose inhabitants were Maronite or Greek Orthodox Christians, located east of esh-Sheikh Mohammed.

Modern era

In August 2021,  at least 28 people were killed and 79 injured in Tleil after a fuel tank exploded. The fuel tanker had been confiscated by the Lebanese army from black marketeers, the fuel was then distributed/taken by the locals. The son of the man whose land the fuel tanker was located on, was later arrested, accused of deliberately causing the explosion.

References

Bibliography

External links
Tleil, Localiban 

Populated places in Akkar District
Maronite Christian communities in Lebanon
Eastern Orthodox Christian communities in Lebanon